The United Kingdom Census 1931 was a census of the United Kingdom of Great Britain and Northern Ireland that was carried out on 26 April 1931. A census in Northern Ireland had been taken in April 1926, so no census was taken there in 1931. The questions asked were similar to those in 1921, with the addition of a question about everyone's usual place of residence, as opposed to where they actually were on that night.

The records for England and Wales were destroyed by fire in December 1942.

Geographical scope
The census for England and Wales, the Channel Islands, and the Isle of Man was stored in London. The census returns for Scotland were stored separately in Edinburgh.

Destruction of 1931 census for England and Wales
The census for England and Wales was destroyed by fire in December 1942, during the Second World War, while in store at the Office of Works in Hayes, Middlesex, in an event that was not attributed to enemy action. The 1931 census for Scotland was not affected by this fire.

There was no census taken in 1941 due to the Second World War; however, the register taken as a result of the National Registration Act 1939, which was released into the public domain on a subscription basis in 2015 with some redactions, captures many of the same details as the census and has assumed greater significance following the destruction of the 1931 census.

See also
Census in the United Kingdom
List of United Kingdom censuses

References

1931
Census
April 1931 events
United Kingdom